The 1994 Appalachian State Mountaineers football team was an American football team that represented Appalachian State University as a member of the Southern Conference (SoCon) during the 1994 NCAA Division I-AA football season. In their sixth year under head coach Jerry Moore, the Mountaineers compiled an overall record of 9–4 with a conference mark of 6–2. Appalachian State advanced to the NCAA Division I-AA Football Championship playoffs, where they defeated New Hampshire in the first round and lost to Boise State in the quarterfinals.

Schedule

References

Appalachian State
Appalachian State Mountaineers football seasons
Appalachian State Mountaineers football